Újpesti Torna Egylet jégkorong szakosztály is an ice hockey club from Újpest, Budapest, Hungary. Újpesti TE is one of the sport clubs in Hungary that are part of the Újpesti TE sport society. The club was founded in 1885, while the ice hockey department was founded in 1930 and refounded in 1955. During its history, the club had won 13 titles of national champions.

Újpest is infamous as being the club of Attila Ambrus, the "Whiskey Robber".

Former names

Bp. Dózsa SE (1955–1956)
Újpesti TE (1956–1957)
Újpesti Dózsa SC (1957–1991)
Újpesti TE (since 1991)

Honours

Hungarian League:
Winners (13) : 1958, 1960, 1965, 1966, 1968, 1969, 1970, 1982, 1983, 1985, 1986, 1987, 1988
Hungarian Cup (Ice Hockey):
Winners (9) : 1965, 1966, 1970, 1971, 1972, 1985, 1986, 1988, 1990

Current roster
Roster for 2022-23 Erste Liga season

Famous players

János Ancsin
József Füzesi
Zoltán Scheiber
József Farkas
László Ancsin
Béla Balog
Attila Ambrus - the "Whiskey Robber"
György Buzás
István Hircsák
Branislav Fabry
Aleksandr Maltsev
Sergei Svetlov
Valeri Vasiliev
Jindrich Kokrment
Sergei Mylnikov
Balázs Ladányi
Jan Kruliš
Ferenc Szamosi (player & head coach)
Vitaly Davydov (head coach)
Józef Voskár
Ján Zlocha

References

External links
  Official website

Sport in Budapest
Újpest FC
Ice hockey teams in Hungary
1930 establishments in Hungary
Carpathian League teams
Erste Liga (ice hockey) teams
Interliga (1999–2007) teams
Ice hockey clubs established in 1930